It's a Hardbop Life is the first Off-Broadway play to feature an entire cast of jazz musicians. The play, co-written by trombonist Gregory Charles Royal and Denise Bird, was developed from Royal's weekly engagement at Birdland in New York City called The Art Blakey Jazz Messenger Review during 2001.

The play debuted at the New York JVC Jazz Festival in July, 2004.

References

American plays
Off-Broadway plays
2004 musicals
2011 plays